Crochet stitches have different terminology in different countries.  Schematic crochet symbols have a consistent meaning internationally.

Basic stitches

References
 Edie Eckman, The Crochet Answer Book, North Adams, Massachesetts: Storey Publishing, 2005.

Crochet
Crochet